James Morgan Philp (20 November 1913 – March 1998) was a Scottish footballer, who played for St Bernards, Heart of Midlothian, East Fife and Brechin City.

Career
Philp was born in Lumphinnans. His first club was Edinburgh side St Bernards before he joined Hearts.

Philp joined East Fife in 1946/47 and became part of the club's famous half back line of Philp, Finlay and Aitken.
 Philp was among the players to have played for the club in their successful post war era when they enjoyed creditable league and cup success.

Twenty years after signing for St Bernards, Philp finished his playing career with Brechin City in 1955.

Philp died in Buckhaven in March 1998.

References

Association football wing halves
Scottish footballers
Brechin City F.C. players
East Fife F.C. players
Heart of Midlothian F.C. players
Scottish Football League players
St Bernard's F.C. players
1913 births
1998 deaths
Date of death missing
People from Lumphinnans
Footballers from Fife